Sonam Sherpa (8 October 1971 – 14 February 2020) was the lead guitarist and a founding member of the Indian band Parikrama.

Early life and education 
Sherpa did his schooling in Kalimpong, West Bengal from St. Augustine's School. He went to Delhi for graduate studies and joined Kirori Mal College for B. Com(Hons), Delhi University. He was a founder member of the band Mrigya and North East Express.

Career 
Sherpa started playing the guitar at the age of 9. He joined Parikrama at its inception in 1991. He remained as the lead guitarist in the band until his death. Sherpa was featured on CNBC's Young Turks, a show focusing on young entrepreneurs. The BBC also featured him and his band in a rockumentary while on their Download Festival Tour. He took steps in the Indian film industry (Bollywood) by composing the songs and music for the feature film “Manjunath”.

Sherpa collaborated with Nitin Malik and Subir Malik (both from Parikrama) to compose music for movie Manjunath. The music of the film received a rating of  2.5 stars from Times of India.

Sherpa owned and ran Parikrama school based at  Hauz Khas Village, New Delhi.

He died of a stroke on 14 February 2020.

References 

1971 births
2020 deaths
People from Kalimpong district
Place of death missing
Indian guitarists
21st-century guitarists
Musicians from West Bengal